Ta'iarapu-Est (literally "Tai'arapu East") is a commune of French Polynesia, an overseas territory of France in the Pacific Ocean. The commune of Tai'arapu-Est is located on the island of Tahiti, in the administrative subdivision of the Windward Islands, themselves part of the Society Islands. At the 2017 census it had a population of 12,701.

Population

Overview
The commune extends over a part of Tahiti Nui ("big Tahiti") and half of the peninsula of Tahiti Iti ("small Tahiti", aka Tai'arapu).

Ta'iarapu-Est consists of the following associated communes:

 Afaahiti
 Faaone
 Pueu
 Tautira

The administrative centre of the commune is the settlement of Afaahiti.

See also
Tepati

References

Communes of French Polynesia